Andrew Johnston (26 February 1916 — 12 April 1993) was a Scottish first-class cricketer.

Johnston was born at Linlithgow in February 1916, where he was educated at the Linlithgow Academy. A club cricketer for Kilmarnock and West Lothian Cricket Club's, Johnston made two appearances in first-class cricket for Scotland on two separate tours of England. The first came against Warwickshire at Edgbaston in 1947, with the second coming against Yorkshire at Scarborough in 1951. He scored 82 runs in his two matches, with a highest score of 50 not out against Yorkshire. With his off break bowling, he took 3 wickets with best figures of 2 for 30. Outside of cricket, he was employed as a clerk. Johnston died suddenly at his Kilmarnock residence in April 1993.

References

External links
 

1916 births
1993 deaths
People from Linlithgow
People educated at Linlithgow Academy
Scottish cricketers